Warner Bros. Discovery International, formerly known as Turner Broadcasting System International and WarnerMedia International, is an international unit of Warner Bros. Discovery led by president Gerhard Zeiler.

Divisions

Asia-Pacific 

 9Rush (joint venture with Nine Entertainment Co.)
 Asian Food Network
 Cartoon Network HD+
 Discovery Asia
 Discovery Kids India
 DMAX (Southeast Asia)
 Eurosport India
 EVE
 JTBC (2.64%)
 Pogo
 Turner Japan
 TABI Channel
 MONDO TV
 World Heritage Channel

New Zealand 

 Bravo (New Zealand) (joint with NBCUniversal International Networks)
 Eden
 Three
 Living
 Rush

Europe, Middle East and Africa 

 Boing
 Boing (Africa)
 Boing (France)
 Boing (Italy) (49% with Mediaset)
 Boing (Spain) (50% with Mediaset España Comunicación)
 DMAX
 DTX
 Fatafeat
 Quest
 Quest Red
 Really
 Tele 5
 Warner Bros. Discovery Italy
 Frisbee
 Giallo
 K2
 Nove
 Real Time
 Warner Bros. Discovery Nordics
 Warner Bros. Discovery Denmark
 6'eren
 Canal 9
 Kanal 4
 Kanal 5 (Denmark)
 Warner Bros. Discovery Finland
 TV5
 Kutonen
 Frii
 Warner Bros. Discovery Norway
 TVNorge
 FEM
 MAX
 VOX
 Warner Bros. Discovery Sweden
 Kanal 5 (Sweden)
 Kanal 9
 Kanal 11
 Warner Bros. Discovery Sports Europe
 BT Sport (50% with BT Group)
 BT Sport 4
 Eurosport
 Eurosport 1
 Eurosport 2
 Eurosport 2 Xtra (Germany)
 Global Cycling Network
 GCN+
 Warner TV Networks
 WarnerTV Comedy
 Warner TV France (joint venture with Canal+ Group)
 WarnerTV Film
 WarnerTV Serie

Poland 

 TVN Group
 TVN
 TVN 7
 TVN24
 TVN24 BiS
 TVN Fabula
 TVN International
 TVN International Extra
 TVN Style
 TVN Turbo
 TTV
 Canal+ Poland (32%; with Canal+ Group and Liberty Global)

 Discovery Historia
 Metro

Americas  

 Discovery Home & Health
 Discovery Kids Latin America
 Redknot (joint venture with Nelvana)
 Discovery Theater
 Discovery World (Latin America)
 Glitz
 Golf Channel Latin America
 HTV
 I.Sat
 Mega Media (27.5% with Bethia)
 Mega
 Mega Ficción
 Mega Plus
 ETC
 MuchMusic
 Particular Crowd
 Raze
 Space
 TNT Series
 TNT Sports
 TNT Sports (Argentina)
 TNT Sports (Brazil)
 Estádio TNT Sports
 TNT Sports (Chile)
 TNT Sports HD
 TNT Sports 2
 TNT Sports 3
 Estadio TNT Sports
 TNT Sports (México)
 Tooncast

Global brands

Cartoon Network Group

Asia-Pacific 
 Cartoon Network
 Australia & New Zealand
 India
 Cartoon Network HD+
 Japan
 Pakistan
 Philippines
 Southeast Asia
 South Korea
 Taiwan
 Boomerang
 Australia
 Southeast Asia

EMEA 
 Cartoon Network
 Arab World
 Africa and MENA
 Central and Eastern Europe
 Russia and Southeastern Europe
 France, Wallonia and Switzerland
 Germany
 Israel 
 Italy
 Netherlands and Flanders
 Pan-Nordic
Portugal
 Spain (via Boing)
 Turkey
 UK & Ireland
 Cartoonito (UK & Ireland)
 Adult Swim
 France
 Germany
 UK & Ireland
 Toonami (France)
 Boomerang
 Africa and MENA
 Central and Eastern Europe
 France
 Italy
 Portugal
 Nordics
 UK and Ireland

Poland 
 Cartoon Network

The Americas 
 Cartoon Network
 Canada
 Latin America
 Cartoonito (Latin America)
 Adult Swim (Canada)

Entertainment Group

Asia-Pacific 
 Investigation Discovery (India)
 Travel Channel International

EMEA 
 TNT
 Africa
 Scandinavia
 Spain
 TCM Movies (UK and Ireland)
 Investigation Discovery
 Africa
 Central and Eastern Europe
 France
 Netherlands and Flanders
 Pan-European
 Portugal
 Sweden
 Travel Channel International

Poland 
 Travel Channel International

The Americas 
 TBS (Latin America)
 TNT (Latin America)
 truTV (Latin America)
 Turner Classic Movies
 Canada
 Latin America
 Investigation Discovery
 Canada (licensed to Bell Media)
 Latin America
 Oprah Winfrey Network (Canada) (licensed to Corus Entertainment)

Factual & Lifestyle Group

Asia-Pacific 
 Animal Planet
 Asia
 Australia and New Zealand
 Discovery Channel
 Australia and New Zealand
 India
 Southeast Asia
 Food Network Asia
 HGTV
 Australia
 Indonesia
 Malaysia
 Hong Kong
 Philippines
 New Zealand
 Singapore
 Taiwan
 Vietnam
 TLC
 Asia
 Australia and New Zealand
 India
 Discovery Science
 India
 Southeast Asia

EMEA 
 Discovery Channel
 Africa, Cyprus, Greece, Malta, Balkans and Central Europe
 Denmark
 Finland
 Belgium
 France
 Germany
 Hungary
 Italy
 MENA
 Netherlands
 Norway
 Portugal
 Russia
 Sweden
 UK and Ireland
 Animal Planet
 Germany
 Netherlands
 Nordics
 Ukraine and Baltic countries
 Food Network
 Italy
 UK and Ireland
 HGTV
 Germany
 Italy
 MENA
 Netherlands
 Romania
 South Africa
 UK and Ireland
 TLC
 Germany
 MENA
 Netherlands
 Sweden
 Turkey
 UK and Ireland
 Discovery Science (EMEA)

Poland 
 Discovery Channel
 Animal Planet
 Food Network

 HGTV
 TLC
 Discovery Life

The Americas 
 Discovery Channel
 Canada (20% with CTV Specialty Television)
 Latin America
 Animal Planet (Canada) (10%)
 Discovery Science
 Canada (10% with CTV Specialty Television)
 Latin America
 Food Network
 Canada (with Corus Entertainment)
 Latin America
 Cooking Channel (Canada) (19.8% with Corus Entertainment)
 HGTV
 Canada (19.76% with Corus Entertainment)
 Latin America
 TLC (Latin America)

CNN Global 
 CNN Chile
 CNN en Español
 CNN International
 CNN Türk (50% with Demirören Group)
 CNN-News18 (joint venture with Network18 Group)

Licensed only 
 A2 CNN (licensed to G2 Media Sh.)
 Antena 3 CNN (licensed to Intact Media Group)
 CNN Brazil (licensed to Novus Media)
 CNN Indonesia (licensed to Trans Media)
 CNN Philippines (licensed to Nine Media Corporation)
 CNN Prima News (licensed to Prima Group)
 CNN Portugal (licensed to Media Capital)
 CNN Radio Argentina (licensed to Argentinos Media)
 CNN Radio Brazil (licensed to Transamérica)

Home Box Office 
 HBO
 Asia
 HBO Hits
 HBO Family
 HBO Signature
 Canada (licensed to Bell Media)
 Central Europe
 HBO 2
 HBO 3
 Latin America (Brazil)
 HBO 2
 HBO+
 HBO Family
 HBO Signature
 HBO Mundi
 HBO Pop
 HBO Xtreme
 Cinemax
 Asia
 Central Europe
 Cinemax 2
 Latin America
 Magnolia Network (Canada) (19.76% with Corus Entertainment)

Miscellaneous networks 
 Discovery Turbo
 Discovery Velocity (10% with CTV Specialty Television)
 Warner TV

References 

Companies based in New York City
Warner Bros. Discovery subsidiaries